Hans Dekkers (16 June 1928 in Eindhoven — 31 August 1984) was a Dutch professional road bicycle racer.

Major results

1949
Omloop der Kempen
1951
 Dutch National Road Race Championship
Ronde van Noord-Holland
1952
 Dutch National Road Race Championship
Houthalen-Helchteren
Tour de France:
Winner stage 19
1953
Breda
Scheldeprijs Vlaanderen
Maastricht
Sas van Gent

External links 

Official Tour de France results for Hans Dekkers

Dutch male cyclists
1928 births
1984 deaths
Dutch Tour de France stage winners
Sportspeople from Eindhoven
Cyclists from North Brabant
20th-century Dutch people